In enzymology, a dihydrostreptomycin-6-phosphate 3'alpha-kinase is an enzyme that catalyzes the chemical reaction

ATP + dihydrostreptomycin 6-phosphate  ADP + dihydrostreptomycin 3'alpha,6-bisphosphate

Thus, the two substrates of this enzyme are ATP and dihydrostreptomycin 6-phosphate, whereas its two products are ADP and dihydrostreptomycin 3'alpha,6-bisphosphate.

This enzyme belongs to the family of transferases, specifically those transferring phosphorus-containing groups (phosphotransferases) with an alcohol group as acceptor.  The systematic name of this enzyme class is ATP:dihydrostreptomycin-6-phosphate 3'alpha-phosphotransferase. Other names in common use include dihydrostreptomycin 6-phosphate kinase (phosphorylating), and ATP:dihydrostreptomycin-6-P 3'alpha-phosphotransferase.

References

 

EC 2.7.1
Enzymes of unknown structure